Totiyapalayam railway station is a station in Tamil Nadu, India.

References

Railway stations in Erode district
Salem railway division